Lake Harney, named for General William S. Harney, is a lake that straddles the county line between Volusia County and Seminole County, Florida, at the coordinates latitude 28°45’21.404", longitude 81° 03’36.019". It is fed by the Saint Johns River which flows through central Florida and feeds many of the nearby lakes such as Lake Monroe.

History 
A large amount of Lake Harney's history can be credited to General William S. Harney and the wars he took part in throughout Florida. Mal Martin, in a 2001 online article, "The Naming of Lake Harney", stated, "William Selby Harney was born in Haysboro, Tennessee, on August 22, 1800." He served during the First and Second Seminole Wars as well as the Mexican-American and Civil War. He retired as a general, died on May 9, 1889, in Orlando, Florida, and was buried at Arlington National Cemetery. 

During the Second Seminole War, a base called Fort Lane was established on the lake as a supply point for U.S. troops. The fort could only be reached, occasionally, by shallow draft vessels. Anything further south than Lake Harney could only be reached by canoe or similar small poled or rowed craft.

Wildlife 
Lake Harney is home to a variety of species of fish, reptiles, water fowl and wading birds. It is nominally fresh water with some salt water springs throughout the area. The lake is home to a variety of fish such as largemouth bass, crappie, bluegill, and redear sunfish, all of which are prey to the lake's birds such as bald eagles, osprey, Crested caracara, white ibis, wood stork (Ibis), herons, cranes, cattle egrets, wild turkeys, a variety of ducks and other water fowl. The Lake Harney Wilderness Area is a protected habitat in which the Florida Fish and Wildlife Conservation Commission, or FWC, observes several bald eagle nests in the area.

References

St. Johns River Water Management District watershed facts: Lake Harney
Seminole County water atlas: Harney, Lake at University of South Florida
Lake Harney at University of South Florida
The Naming of Lake Harney at USGenNet.org
Seminole County rules of use

Harney
Lakes of Volusia County, Florida
Lakes of Seminole County, Florida
Seminole Wars